Cantarella was a poison.

Cantarella may also refer to:
 Cantarella (manga) ,a manga series by You Higuri about the fictionalized life of Cesare Borgia
 Cantarella (song), a song sung by Vocaloid
 Eva Cantarella
 Richard Cantarella